The 1970–71 Coppa Italia, the 24th Coppa Italia was an Italian Football Federation domestic cup competition won by Torino.

Group stage

Group 1

Group 2

Group 3 

Play-off match

p=after penalty shoot-out

Group 4

Group 5

Group 6

Group 7

Group 8

Group 9

Qualifying play-off 
The top seven groupwinners of the nine group qualifier in the quarter-finals. The other two teams played playoff.

p=after penalty shoot-out

Quarter-finals

Final group

Final play-off

Top goalscorers

References 

 rsssf.com

Coppa Italia seasons
Coppa Italia
Coppa Italia